I Was Meant for You is a 1913 American drama film featuring Harry Carey.

Cast
 Charles West as Theron
 Claire McDowell as Lavina
 Harry Carey as Luke
 Lionel Barrymore as Lavina's Father
 John T. Dillon as In Town

See also
 Harry Carey filmography

External links

1913 films
1913 short films
American silent short films
American black-and-white films
Films directed by Anthony O'Sullivan
1913 drama films
American drama films
1910s American films
Silent American drama films